Rage: Mutant Bash TV is a first-person shooter video game developed by id Software and published by Bethesda Softworks.
The game serves as a tie-in to the game of the same name that was later released in October 2011.

Development
In his keynote speech at QuakeCon 2010 on August 12, 2010, Carmack announced that id was developing a Rage-related game for Apple's iOS. He later described the mobile Rage as a "little slice of Rage ... [about] Mutant Bash TV, a post-apocalyptic combat game show in the Rage wasteland", and separately hinted that he might try to port Rage Mobile to Android, although he later stated no id games would be coming to Android due to lack of financial viability.

Reception

Rage: Mutant Bash TV received received average reviews, according to the aggregate review site Metacritic.

References

External links
 

2010 video games
Bethesda Softworks games
First-person adventure games
First-person shooters
Id Software games
Id Tech games
IOS games
Video games about impact events
Multiplayer and single-player video games
Fiction about near-Earth asteroids
Open-world video games
Post-apocalyptic video games
Video games adapted into comics
Video games developed in the United States
Video games set in the 22nd century